Selangor is one of the states in Malaysia that awards honours and titles.

2000
 Abdullah Ahmad Badawi is sole recipient of Sri Paduka Mahkota Selangor (SPMS) award which carries the title .
 2 recipients of Datuk Seri Sultan Salahuddin Abdul Aziz Shah (SSSA) which also carries the title .
 20 recipients of Datuk Paduka Mahkota Selangor (DPMS) which carries the title .
 65 recipients of Datuk Sultan Salahuddin Abdul Aziz Shah (DSSA) which also carries the title .

2001
 2 recipients of Sri Paduka Mahkota Selangor (SPMS) award which carries the title .
 2 recipients of Datuk Seri Sultan Salahuddin Abdul Aziz Shah (SSSA) which also carries the title .
 20 recipients of Datuk Paduka Mahkota Selangor (DPMS) which carries the title .
 66 recipients of Datuk Sultan Salahuddin Abdul Aziz Shah (DSSA) which also carries the title .

2002
 2 recipients of Sri Paduka Mahkota Selangor (SPMS) award which carries the title .
 2 recipients of Datuk Setia Sultan Sharaffudin Idris Shah (SSIS) award which carries the title .
 18 recipients of Datuk Paduka Mahkota Selangor (DPMS) which carries the title .
 20 recipients of Datuk Sultan Sharafuddin Idris Shah (DSIS) which also carries the title .

2003
 2 recipients of Sri Paduka Mahkota Selangor (SPMS) award which carries the title .
 2 recipients of Datuk Setia Sultan Sharaffudin Idris Shah (SSIS) award which carries the title Datuk Setia.
 18 recipients of Datuk Paduka Mahkota Selangor (DPMS) which carries the title .
 9 recipients of Datuk Sultan Sharafuddin Idris Shah (DSIS) which also carries the title .

2015
The 2015 Selangor State Honours and Awards ceremony was held on 12 December 2015 at Istana Alam Shah, Klang. Below are the list of recipients of the honours and titles:

Royal Family Order of Selangor
Syed Anwar Tuanku Syed Putra Jamalulail, the

Order of the Crown of Selangor

Knight Grand Commander
Azmin Ali, the 15th Menteri Besar of Selangor

Knight Commander
Mohd Na'im Mokhtar, the Chief Judge of Selangor's Syariah Court
Nik Shuhaimi Nik Sulaiman, the Selangor state's legal advisor
Afifi Al-Akiti, 
Zainul Rashid Mohamad Razi, the Deputy Dean of Graduate and International Relations of Pusat Perubatan Universiti Kebangsaan Malaysia
S. Balachandran, the director of Selangor's Health Department  
Puasa Md Taib, President of Sepang Municipal Council
Mohd Zaki Ibrahim, director of Selangor's Town and Rural Planning Department 
Nazir Razak, chairman of CIMB Group Holdings

Member
Tengku Ezrique Ezzuddean Tengku Ardy Esfandiari, member of Selangor royal family
Tuan Abdul Malik Soleh, a judge in Selangor's Syariah Judiciary Department 
Major Khalid Yaacob, the administration staff officer 2 at the medical headquarter of Malaysian Armed Forces 
Lieutenant Commander Azlina Ahmad Zaini, the staff officer 2 of women's affairs (A) and secretary of BAKAT (L) in Royal Malaysian Navy 
Noor Asdiana Abdul Kadir, the corporate secretary in Selangor state government's secretariat office
Rahilah Rahmat, the chief assistant district officer of Klang Land and District Office 
Abdul Karim Jabar, the vice director of education policy planning and research division in the Ministry of Education
Noor Huda Roslan, the chief registrar of Selangor's Syariah Judiciary Department 
Mas Sakdah Kamaruzzaman, the chief assistant secretary of the Human Resource Management Division at the Selangor State Secretary's office
Mohd Shahrizal Mohd Salleh, the chief assistant financial officer of the Selangor State Treasury
Fatimah Sham, director of UiTM Shah Alam's University Community Transformation Center (UCTC)
Surya Wati Shawal, legal officer of Petaling Jaya Sessions/Magistrate Court
Mohamad Zin Masod, corporate director of Selayang Municipal Council
N. Jeeva, the general manager of internal audit of the Social Security Organization (SOCSO)

Order of Sultan Sharafuddin Idris Shah

Knight Grand Companion
Tengku Azman Shah, member of Selangor Council of the Royal Court 
Mohd Zawawi Salleh, judge of the Court of Appeal
Muhammed Khusrin Munawi, Selangor state secretary

Knight Companion
Raja Reza Raja Zaid Shah, Malaysia's Deputy Permanent Representative to the United Nations (UN) in New York
Ong Thiam Hock, the Deputy Fleet Commander of the Royal Malaysian Navy
Saadah Ismail, the Deputy Vice Chancellor of Industry, Community and Alumni Network of Universiti Teknologi MARA
Nooral Zeila Junid, a public health dental specialist in Planning Division of the Ministry of Health
Ang Nai Har, the director of the Selangor National Audit Department
Abdul Jalil Nordin, the Dean of the Faculty of Medicine, Health Sciences of Universiti Putra Malaysia
Mohamad Nasir Ab Latif, the deputy chief executive officer (Investment) of Employees Provident Fund (KWSP)
Azmi Abdul Aziz, the group managing director of Prasarana Malaysia
Cheah See Yeong, director of MCT Konsortium 
Tan Siok Choo, the recipient of the Honorary Doctoral Degree of Plantation Management in Universiti Putra Malaysia

Member
Lieutenant Colonel Mohd Safiee Mohd Yusof, the commanding officer of the Penang's Royal Malaysian Air Force Development and Management Center
Norliza Zulkifli, the senior federal counsel of the Selangor Legal Advisory Room 
Mohd Faizal Abdul Raji, the chief assistant district officer of the Kuala Selangor Land and District Office
Zailani Panot, the Klang Municipal Council's town and country planning officer
Mohd Wazir Abdul Gani, the marketing manager of Selangor State Development Corporation (PKNS)
Mohd Basri Abdul Manaf, the chief assistant director general of Selangor Forestry Department
Mohd Azhar Sarid @ Mohd Sharif, Shah Alam City Council's administrative officer
Suhaimi Sabran, the school improvement specialist coaching officer at the Sabak Bernam District Education Office
Zainal Abidin Sulaiman, the religious administrative officer/senior registrar of JAIS
Azman Dahlan, the secretary of Hulu Selangor District Council
Anizan Ibrahim, the Hostel Manager of Yayasan Selangor Klang
Nurhani Salwa Jamaluddin, Selangor Islamic Religious Council's (MAIS) legal advisor
Zainuddin Tasiman, Raja Tun Uda Public Library's administrative officer
Mohamed Idris Haron, the assistant medical officer of Kuala Lumpur and Putrajaya Health Department
Mohd Asari Daud, the assistant medical officer of the Department of Anesthesiology and Intensive Care at Tengku Ampuan Rahimah Hospital (HTAR)

Distinguished Service Star
Sub-inspector Md Punzan Yusof, Sub-inspector of welfare 
S. Sivaraja, the head of Industrial Relations Branch of Peretak's National Youth Skills Institute (IKBN) 
Faizah Mohd Shafawi, the assistant financial officer at the Selangor State Treasury
Mohammad Khair Mahidin, the education management supervisor of the Klang Islamic Religious Department
Mohd Azman Mohd Amin, the assistant auditor of the Internal Audit Division at the Selangor State Secretary's Office
Abd Rahim Jantan, the assistant land officer of Hulu Selangor District and Land Office
Saadah Mohd Sekak, the senior administrative assistant (retired) of Selangor State Secretary's Office Management Services Division

2019 
The 2019 Selangor State Honours and Awards ceremony was held on 11 December 2019 at Istana Alam Shah, Klang. Below are the list of recipients of the honours and titles:

Order of the Crown of Selangor

Knight Grand Commander
 Amirudin Shari, the 16th Menteri Besar of Selangor

Knight Commander
 Mohamad Adib Husain, Selangor Syariah Chief Judge
 Nur Ashikin Mohd Taib, Malaysian Ambassador to Sweden
 Vice Admiral Datuk Abdul Rahman Ayob, deputy chief of Royal Malaysian Navy 
 Major General Datuk Badrul Hisham Muhammad, Army Headquarters Assistant Chief of Staff 
 Datuk Ir Hashim Osman, Selangor Water Authority (LUAS) director 
 Datuk Yeoh Seok Hong, YTL Power International Berhad managing director 
 Zamani Ahmad Mansor, Selangor deputy State Secretary (Management)
 Professor Dr Zulkifli Idrus, Universiti Putra Malaysia deputy vice-chancellor (Research and Innovation) 
 Zulkiflee Othman, Universiti Putra Malaysia Bursar

Companion
 Captain Mahadzir Mokhtar, head of Operations and Construction Division of the Royal Malaysian Navy Headquarters
 Colonel Idros Muhammad, Malaysian Army headquarters Royal Intelligence Corps director
 Mohd Faizal Abdul Raji, Kuala Selangor Land and District Office district officer

Order of Sultan Sharafuddin Idris Shah

Knight Grand Companion
 Professor Datin Paduka Dr Aini Ideris, vice-chancellor of Universiti Putra Malaysia

Knight Companion
 Syed Haizam Hishamuddin Putra Jamalullail Syed Anwar Jamalullail, 
 Raja Muzaffar Raja Redzwa, 
 First Admiral Shamsuddin Ludin, assistant Chief of Communications and Electronics Division of Malaysian Armed Forces headquarters
 Rear Admiral Hanafiah Hassan, director-general of National Hydrographic Centre 
 Senior Assistant Commissioner Fadzil Ahmat, Selangor CID chief
 Datuk Mohd Khay Ibrahim, Zikay Group Berhad Group managing director
 Ahmad Fasal Zakaria, Selangor Sultan's Office protocol officer
 Yap Chong Heong, Tanjung Balai Group director

Companion
 Tengku Munazirah Tengku Abdul Samad Shah Alhaj, founder of Hope Factory Malaysia and the Sultan's niece
 Commander Zailara Zainal, assistant Chief of Engineering Services, Western Naval Logistics Headquarters Royal Malaysian Navy 
 Zamri Abdul Rahman, Worldwide Holdings Berhad chief operating officer (environment)

References

External links
The Star - The Sultan of Selangor's Birthday Honours List, 13 December 2003.
The Star - Sultan of Selangor's birthday honours list, 11 December 2002.
Datukship awards: Selangor Sultan's decision to reduce yearly awards wise, necessary and timely statement by DAP Secretary General on 7 December 2002.
The Star - Sultan of Selangor's honours list, 2 April 2001.
The Star - Sultan of Selangor's birthday honours list, 12 March 2000.

Malaysian honours list
Selangor